William Grassam (20 November 1878 – 1943) was a Scottish footballer who played as a forward.

Career
Grassam played for Scottish Junior Football Association sides Redcliffe Thistle and Maryhill before joining English side Burslem Port Vale in July 1899. He scored three goals in the opening five Second Division fixtures of the 1899–1900 campaign, and finished the season with ten goals in 41 games. In the summer of 1900 he moved on to West Ham United of the Southern League. On 1 September 1900, he became the first West Ham player to score a hat-trick, when he scored four goals on his debut against Gravesend United. The club finished sixth in 1900–01. He finished as the club's joint-top scorer (with George Ratcliffe) in 1901–02 with 10 goals. After West Ham finished tenth in 1902–03, Grassam returned to Scotland with Celtic.

In September 1903, he went back to England to join Manchester United and scored 11 goals in 23 games in his first season with the club, becoming joint-top scorer in the league (with Billy Griffiths and Tommy Arkesden). However, he fell out of favour the following season, contributing just two goals in six league games, before moving on to Leyton in July 1905. He rejoined West Ham later that year, where he built up a solid partnership with Harry Stapley. The Boleyn Ground outfit finished 11th in 1905–06, 5th in 1906–07, 10th in 1907–08, 17th in 1908–09, and 9th in 1909–10. Having lost his first-team place to Danny Shea, Grassam moved on to league rivals Brentford in 1910. He was the second-highest goal scorer of the period for the "Hammers" behind Shea, before the club joined the Football League in 1919.

Career statistics

References

1878 births
1943 deaths
People from Larbert
Footballers from Falkirk (council area)
Scottish footballers
Association football inside forwards
Maryhill F.C. players
Port Vale F.C. players
West Ham United F.C. players
Celtic F.C. players
Manchester United F.C. players
Leyton F.C. players
Brentford F.C. players
Scottish Junior Football Association players
English Football League players
Southern Football League players